HBG may refer to:

 HBG (time signal), a former Swiss radio transmission facility
 Hachette Book Group, an American publisher
 Haliburton Broadcasting Group, a former Canadian broadcaster
 Handball Grauholz, a Swiss handball club
 Hattiesburg (Amtrak station), in Mississippi, United States
 Hattiesburg Bobby L. Chain Municipal Airport, in Mississippi, United States
 Heather Baron-Gracie, lead singer and guitarist of indie pop band Pale Waves
 Hermann-Böse-Gymnasium, a secondary school in Germany
 Hollandsche Beton Groep, a Netherlands-based construction and civil engineering group
 Batu Gajah Hospital, a public hospital in Perak, Malaysia
 Hollywood Bowl Group, bowling and mini-golf company based in the United Kingdom 
 Hicky's Bengal Gazette, the first newspaper printed in India
 Horácio Bento de Gouveia, a middle school in Funchal, Madeira, Portugal